Khao Luang (เขาหลวง) is the tallest mountain in southern Thailand. It is in Nakhon Si Thammarat Province.

Geography
The Khao Luang mountain is the highest summit of a massif of several hills with steep slopes. It is part of the Nakhon Si Thammarat Range, a subrange of the Tenasserim Hills.

Geologically this mountain formation consists of a granite core under loose soils. On steep slopes, the soil covering the mountains can cause landslides when saturated with water.

Some of the forests of the area were felled to give way to rubber plantations.

Khao Luang National Park

Khao Luang National Park is named after Khao Luang mountain. The park is mountainous with many tall peaks along its range.

The park covers an area of 356,250 rai ~  with a large variety of wildlife and habitats, including mountains, forests, rivers and waterfalls. The park was designated a national park on 18 December 1974, becoming the ninth national park in Thailand.

The mountainous park is a watershed for the Tapee River, Pakphanang River, Klai River and Pakpoon River, Nopphitam.

Climate
Due to the park's location on the peninsula, it receives monsoons from both the east and the west coasts and means that the park receives rain all year and also cold weather. There are two main seasons. Rainy season from May to January with the heaviest rainfall between October and December. Hot season is between February and April.

Flora and fauna
Moist evergreen forest, which can be found in the valleys and in damp gullies and riversides. Hill evergreen forest and lower montaine forest. Over 300 species of orchids can be seen within the park. Khao Luang is the only place in the world where some of these can be found. There are no fewer than 327 species of animals living in Khao Luang, some of these include; Malayan tapir, Sumatran serow, pig-tailed macaque, Asiatic brush-tailed porcupine, clouded leopard, barking deer, sambar deer, binturong, panther, tiger, wild pig, banded langur and spectacled langur. Bird species include black eagle, red junglefowl, great argus pheasant, crested fireback pheasant, white-crowned hornbill, bushy-crested hornbill, great pied hornbill, helmeted hornbill, red-crowned barbet and sunbirds.

Similarly named locations
There are other mountains called "Khao Luang" at other locations in Thailand:
 Khao Luang, Hui Yang, Prachuap Khiri Khan Province, Namtok Huai Yang National Park.
 Khao Luang (92 m) and Khao Luang Cave, Hua Hin.
 Khao Luang Cave Temple near Phetchaburi.

See also
List of mountains in Thailand
Nakhon Si Thammarat Province
List of national parks of Thailand
List of Protected Areas Regional Offices of Thailand

References

External links

 Bird List of Khao Luang National Park (Nakhon Si Thammarat province)

Tenasserim Hills
Mountains of Thailand
National parks of Thailand
Protected areas established in 1974
Geography of Nakhon Si Thammarat province
1974 establishments in Thailand